The women's 10 metre platform, also reported as high diving, was one of four diving events on the diving at the 1932 Summer Olympics programme. The competition was actually held from both 10 metre and 5 metre platforms. Divers performed a total of four compulsory dives – running plain header forward, standing backward spring and forward dive with pike (10 metre), standing forward plain header, running forward plain header (5 metre). The competition was held on Friday 12 August 1932. Seven divers from five nations competed.

Results
Since there were only seven entries, instead of groups, a direct final was contested.

Final

References

Sources
  

Women
1932
1932 in women's diving
Div